Mahdi/Mehdi Ouatine (born 26 September 1987) is a Moroccan amateur boxer who qualified for the 2008 Olympics by winning the 1st AIBA African 2008 Olympic Qualifying Tournament in the featherweight division. He lost his Olympic debut 1:10 to Mongolian Zorigtbaataryn Enkhzorig.

External links
 Qualifier

Living people
1987 births
Boxers at the 2008 Summer Olympics
Olympic boxers of Morocco
Competitors at the 2013 Mediterranean Games
Featherweight boxers
Moroccan male boxers
Mediterranean Games competitors for Morocco
21st-century Moroccan people